This is a list of the governors of the province of Paktia, Afghanistan.

Governors of Paktia Province

See also
 List of current governors of Afghanistan

Notes

Paktia